Birchwood Community High School is a coeducational secondary school and sixth form with academy status, located in the Birchwood area of Warrington in the English county of Cheshire.

Previously a community school administered by Warrington Borough Council, Birchwood Community High School converted to academy status on 1 July 2013. However, the school continues to coordinate with Warrington Borough Council regarding its admissions.

Birchwood Community High School offers GCSEs and BTECs as programmes of study for pupils, while students in the sixth form (named Birchwood College) have the option to study from a range of A-levels and further BTECs.

Their pastoral system is made up of four Houses: Fides, Libertas, Veneratio and Dedicatio – the Latin names of their core values of belief, independence, respect and commitment. Each House is made up of forms from across all five year groups to form a pastoral family. They have weekly assemblies together and compete in the regular House competitions to strive to be awarded the accolade of House of the Year in the summer term and win the House Cup.

History
Birchwood Community High School was opened in September 1985, by the first headteacher Sheila Yates. The aim back then was to be a focal point for the area of Birchwood. Birchwood has grown from 180 pupils and 14 staff in 1985 to 1016 pupils and over 200 staff in 2021.

Notable former pupils
 George Sampson Britain's Got Talent Champion 2008, Actor in various shows
 Josh Brownhill Footballer - formerly of Preston North End and Bristol City, currently playing for Burnley
 Joseph Ryan Rugby league player - currently playing for Warrington Wolves
 James Chester Footballer - formerly of Manchester United, Hull City, West Bromwich Albion, currently at Aston Villa (on loan at Stoke City)
 Stephen Jordan (footballer)
Former footballer for Manchester City  and numerous other clubs.
Jordan Thorniley- footballer for Blackpool fc 
 David Brooks Footballer - formerly of Sheffield United and FC Halifax Town, currently playing for AFC Bournemouth and Wales
 Brianna Ghey transgender TikTok creator, killed February 2023

References

External links
Birchwood Community High School official website

Secondary schools in Warrington
Academies in Warrington
Educational institutions established in 1985
1985 establishments in England